The Lyonheart K is a proposed British-built grand tourer based on Jaguar XK running gear. It was planned to be unveiled at the 2012 Geneva Motor Show as a development of the 2011 concept Vizualtech Growler E and is a reinterpretation of the Jaguar E-Type. 

The unveiling of the K was delayed and was not shown at the scheduled 2014 Geneva Motor Show following plans to change the platform and engine to the newer Jaguar F-Type. Sales were scheduled to commence in 2015.

The K was to be manufactured in Coventry by the newly created Lyonheart Cars company, owned by Swiss-based Classic Factory. Up until late 2015 there was no evidence that the company had built either a prototype or any other touchable or viewable artefact. This design exists solely as computer-generated 3D images, and as of 2020, the official website is no longer live.

Lyonheart Cars Ltd was dissolved in February 2017.

Specifications

It was intended to use the 5.0 L supercharged V8 from the Jaguar XK.

References

External links

Grand tourers
Rear-wheel-drive vehicles
Coupés
2010s cars